Van Deren is both a surname and a given name. Notable people with the name include:

Diane Van Deren (born 1960), American ultra-runner
Van Deren Coke (1921–2004), American photographer and museum director

See also
Van Dieren (surname)

Surnames of Dutch origin